Cetacea Rocks are a small group of rocks off the northeast side of Hoseason Island, in the Palmer Archipelago in the Antarctic. They were charted by the French Antarctic Expedition under Jean-Baptiste Charcot, 1908–1910, and named by the UK Antarctic Place-Names Committee in 1960 after the zoological order Cetacea (whales and porpoises); these rocks lie in one of the chief Antarctic whaling areas.

References
 

Rock formations of the Palmer Archipelago